NGC 2374 is an open cluster in the Canis Major constellation.

External links
 
 

Canis Major
2374
Open clusters